Juggy may refer to:

 a member of the dance group in the American TV show The Man Show
Juggy D (born 1981), British bhangra singer
Juggy Murray (1923–2005), American rhythm and blues music producer
Christa Hughes, also known as KK Juggy, Australian singer

See also 
 Juggi (disambiguation)
 Jugi (disambiguation)